On November 6, 1986, Washington, D.C., held an election for its mayor, with Democratic candidate and incumbent mayor Marion Barry defeating Republican candidate Carol Schwartz.

Incumbent Marion Barry sought a third term as mayor in 1986. By this time, his dominance of city politics was so absolute that he faced only token opposition in the Democratic primary in the form of former school board member Mattie Taylor, whom Barry dispatched rather easily. Barry had expected to face Jesse Jackson, who had been encouraged by colleagues to seek the mayoralty, and who had been relatively popular in stark contrast to Barry's declining reputation. Barry, who knew that most of Jackson's income came from delivering speeches, used his political clout to arbitrarily disqualify Jackson by getting a law passed that said anyone who made more than a certain amount in honoraria was ineligible to run for D.C. office. Council members jokingly called this the "Jesse Jackson law," as it was legislated expressly to keep Jackson out of the mayoral race.

As expected, he defeated Republican city councilwoman Carol Schwartz fairly handily in the November 4 general election. However, Schwartz won 33 percent of the vote—the first time a Republican had crossed the 30-percent barrier in a general election. For the third time, Barry received the endorsement of The Washington Post but "with far greater reservations and misgivings" than at any time in the past.

Results

Democratic primary

DC Statehood primary

See also
 Electoral history of Marion Barry

References

Mayoral
Washington, D.C.
1986
Washington, D.C.